Christian Friedrich Scharnweber, born 10 February 1770 in Weende and died 1822 in Kloster Eberbach, was a Prussian officer. He was the state councillor of Alt-Hohenschönhausen from 1817 onwards, and had considerable influence over Karl August von Hardenberg

References

1770 births
1822 deaths
People from Göttingen (district)
Prussian Army personnel